Jean-Antoine Romagnesi (1690 in Namur – 11 May 1742 in Fontainebleau) was an 18th-century French actor and playwright, the son of Italian comedians.

Romagnesi appeared in Paris at the Théâtre de la Foire, started without success at the Comédie-Française then played nearly twenty years in the Comédie-Italienne where he was especially successful in the roles of Swiss, Germans and drunkards.

He wrote extensively, alone or in collaboration, notably parodies, bouffonneries and harlequinades.

Some of his works were collected (Paris, nouv. édit. 1772, 2 vol. in-8°).

Sources 
 Gustave Vapereau, Dictionnaire universel des littératures, Paris, Hachette, 1876,

External links 
 Works by Jean-Antoine Romagnesi on onlinebooks.library.
 Books by Jean-Antoine Romagnesi

18th-century French dramatists and playwrights
18th-century French male actors
French male stage actors
1690 births
1742 deaths